HFW is a global, sector-focused law firm providing services to businesses in aerospace, commodities, construction, energy and resources, insurance and reinsurance, and shipping. The firm was founded in 1883 and now has more than 600 lawyers, including 170 partners, based in 20 offices across the Americas, Europe, the Middle East, Asia and Australia.

History
HFW was founded in 1883, and its early expertise was representing maritime clients following shipwrecks and collisions. It has since broadened its practice to focus on six core sectors globally: aerospace, commodities, construction, energy and resources, insurance and reinsurance, and shipping. In June 2017, the firm changed its name from Holman Fenwick Willan to HFW.

HFW was one of the first London-based law firms to expand internationally, opening its first international office in 1977, in Paris. A year later, it became one of the first international law firms to open an office in Hong Kong. HFW then launched in Singapore in 1990, Piraeus in 1993 and Shanghai in 1999. It moved into Australia and the Middle East in 2006, opening offices in Melbourne and Dubai. HFW subsequently expanded its Australia presence, launching offices in Sydney in 2009 and Perth in 2011. It also opened offices in Brussels in 2009, Geneva in 2010 and São Paulo in 2011.

In June 2016, HFW became only the second international law firm to enter into a formal association with a Chinese law firm under the Shanghai Free Trade Zone rules.

In January 2017, the firm merged with US law firm Legge, Farrow, Kimmitt, McGrath & Brown. This was notable for being a fully integrated merger, whereas most transatlantic law firm combinations at the time used the Swiss Verein structure.

In June 2018, HFW expanded its Latin America presence by entering into a cooperation arrangement with a new Brazilian law firm, Costa, Albino & Lasalvia (CAL).

In October 2018, the firm opened in Abu Dhabi with the hire of two partners from Reed Smith. The move meant HFW had 19 partners and more than 50 lawyers - including 28 Arabic speakers - in four offices across the Middle East, making it one of the largest practices of any international law firm in the region. HFW also has an office in Riyadh, and is one of only two international law firms with a base in Kuwait City.

In August 2019, the firm launched in Monaco with the hire of a market-leading team from Ince.

Core sectors and services 
HFW is unusual for an international law firm in that it is focused on sectors, rather than practice areas. The firm's entire business, from legal services to CSR and pro bono, is built around six core sectors globally:

Sectors

 Aerospace
 Commodities
 Construction
 Energy and Resources
 Insurance and Reinsurance
 Shipping

The firm also offers a broad range of legal services:

Services

 Dispute Resolution
Corporate
Finance
 EU, Competition and Regulatory
 Fraud and Insolvency
 International Trade Regulation
 Commercial
 Cyber Security
Data Protection
Digital Trade
Employment
Financial Institutions
Financial Services Regulation
Government Services
Logistics
Mining
Oil and Gas
Ports and Terminals
Projects

The firm has one of the largest and most active disputes practices in the market, covering litigation, international arbitration and alternative forms of dispute resolution. HFW was the most active law firm in the English Commercial Court in 2017 and 2018, according to The Lawyer's Litigation Tracker. It is also the most active law firm for arbitration-related litigation and one of the most active firms litigating on behalf of FTSE 100 clients.

Awards and recognition
HFW featured in the 2019 Social Mobility Employer Index, which lists the UK organisations taking the most action to tackle social mobility. HFW was also ranked in the index, which is produced by UK charity the Social Mobility Foundation, in 2017 and 2018.

Offices

The firm has 20 offices across Europe, the Middle East, the Americas, Asia and Australia: London, Paris, Monaco, Hong Kong, Singapore, Piraeus, Shanghai, Melbourne, Dubai, Sydney, Brussels, Geneva, Perth, São Paulo, Kuwait, Riyadh, Houston, Jakarta, Rio de Janeiro and Abu Dhabi.

References

Law firms established in 1883
Law firms based in London
1883 establishments in the United Kingdom
Foreign law firms with offices in Hong Kong